Diamonds is a French and Canadian-produced television series, which aired from September 22, 1987, to 1989. The show starred Nicholas Campbell as Mike Devitt and Peggy Smithhart as Christina Towne, former actors who had met and married while playing private investigators on a TV series called Two of Diamonds, and continued to work together as real private investigators after both their divorce and the cancellation of their show.

The show was frequently compared to the American series Moonlighting. In a direct nod to the comparison, one episode actually featured an encounter with a character who mistook Devitt and Towne for Bruce Willis and Cybill Shepherd.

The cast also included Roland Magdane, Geraint Wyn Davies and Tony Rosato. Campbell was also an occasional writer for the series.

Produced by Alliance Entertainment, the series aired on Global in Canada, and in a late night slot on CBS in the United States, as well as on the USA Network. It was one of several Canadian-produced drama series to air in the CBS Late Night block of crime dramas — others included Adderly, Night Heat and Hot Shots. Of those shows, it was the only one to explicitly acknowledge that it was set in Toronto.

Diamonds also aired on RTÉ Television in Ireland.

Cast
Nicholas Campbell as Mike Devitt
Peggy Smithhart as Christina Towne
Roland Magdane as Rene (season 2)
Tony Rosato as Lt. Lou Gianetti

Episodes

Season 1: 1987–88

Season 2: 1988–89

References

External links

1980s Canadian crime drama television series
1980s Canadian comedy-drama television series
CBS original programming
Global Television Network original programming
1987 Canadian television series debuts
1989 Canadian television series endings
Television shows set in Toronto